Jennifer Nesbitt (born 24 January 1995), also known as Jenny Nesbitt, is a British long-distance runner. She represented Wales in the 10000m at the 2018 Commonwealth Games.

In 2019, she competed in the senior women's race at the 2019 IAAF World Cross Country Championships held in Aarhus, Denmark. She finished in 34th place.

Major competition record

References

External links
 

Living people
1995 births
British female long-distance runners
Competitors at the 2017 Summer Universiade
Athletes (track and field) at the 2018 Commonwealth Games
Commonwealth Games competitors for Wales